Almaraz is a surname. Notable people with the surname include:

 Carlos Almaraz (1941–1989), Mexican-American artist
 Bárbara Almaraz (born 1979), Mexican women's international footballer
 Johnny Almaraz (born 1965), American baseball director of amateur scouting for the Philadelphia Phillies
 Enrique Almaraz y Santos (1847–1922), a cardinal of the Roman Catholic Church, Archbishop of Seville and, later, Archbishop of Toledo

See also
 Almaraz, a town in Cáceres Province, Extremadura, Spain
 Almaraz de Duero, a municipality in the province of Zamora, Castile and León, Spain
 Rowland Hill, 1st Viscount Hill, first raised to peerage in 1814 as Baron Hill of Almaraz and of Hawkestone in the county of Salop
 Abel Almarez (born 1941), Argentine boxer